TWELVE Centennial Park is a mixed-use complex located in Downtown Atlanta. The project plans consist of two residential highrise towers of 39 stories each and one mid-rise hotel.

Planning
The combined residential towers would contain 1,024 condominium units while the hotel consists of 102 rooms. Due to the Great Recession, only one of the two residential towers was completed in 2007. The site of the other tower remains open and prepared for future construction.

The TWELVE Centennial Park is one of the tallest residential luxury high-rises in the Atlanta area.

See also
List of tallest buildings in Atlanta

References

External links

Hotel Website
Novare Group Profile
Emporis Listing for Phase I
Property page on Preferred Family

Residential skyscrapers in Atlanta